The Gyeongui Line was a railway line of the Chosen Government Railway running from Gyeongseong to Sinuiju in Korea. After the partition of Korea in 1945, the line was divided between North and South Korea.

History

Origins, to 1910
Construction of a railway line running north from Hanseong had been envisioned since the end of the 19th century, but the lack of funding led to the failure of several attempts. Over the last five years of the century several abortive attempts were made to that end. In 1896 the French Fives Lille obtained the rights to build a railway line in Korea, but after failing to secure the necessary funding, the rights were transferred to the "Korean Railway Company" (대한철도회사, Hanguk Cheoldohoesa) in 1899. However, this attempt likewise went nowhere. Finally, in 1900, the government-owned "Western Railway" (서부철도회사, Seobu Cheoldohoesa) began surveying a route for a railway from Gyeongseong to Gaeseong. Construction of what was to become the first section of the Gyeongui Line began in 1902. The line's name was derived from the names of the two proposed termini, Gyeongseong and Sinuiju.

Imperial Japan, which had gained the concession to build the Gyeongbu Line from Seoul to Busan, recognised that a railway running through all of Korea from north to south would serve as a means to strengthen its influence over Korea, sought to gain control of the Gyeongui Line project as well. When the Russo-Japanese War broke out in 1904, Japan ignored Korea's declaration of neutrality, transporting troops to Incheon and forcing the Korean government to sign an agreement that gave Japan's military control of railway projects if deemed necessary for military operations. The Imperial Japanese Army then established the Temporary Military Railway Office, and took over control of the Western Railway, intending to use the line to assist with military operations against Russia in Manchuria. The Yongsan–Gaeseong section was completed in March 1904, followed by the completion of the Pyeongyang–Sinuiju (today's Kangan Station) section on 28 April 1905, and freight operations between Yongsan and Sinuiju began on 5 November of that year. Although the war had ended on 5 September of that year, the Japanese military retained control of the Temporary Military Railway, still intent on using it to ensure its dominance in Korea. In the following year, bridges were completed over the Cheongcheon and Daedong rivers, allowing for the operation of through trains between Yongsan and Sinŭiju. The Gyeongui Line was officially opened on 3 April 1906.

Twelve days after freight operations began on the Gyeongui Line, the Second Japan–Korea Convention was signed, making the Empire of Korea a protectorate of the Empire of Japan, with the Japanese Resident-General representing Japan in Korea. The Administration of the Resident-General established its Railway Office on 1 July 1906, at the same time nationalising the privately owned (by Japanese interests) Gyeongbu Railway, which by then was the only other railway operator in Korea besides the Temporary Military Railway. On 1 September of that year, the Railway Office took over control of the Gyeongui Line from the military and merged it with the Gyeongbu Railway to create the National Railway Administration.

The National Railway initiated passenger service on the Gyeongui Line on 1 April 1908, and Korea's first express train, the "Ryūki", began operating between Sinuiju and Busan via Gyeongseong. The National Railway was reformed on 18 June 1909, being replaced by the newly established Korea Railway. When Korea was annexed by Japan on 29 August 1910, the creation of the Government-General of Korea led to the establishment of the Railway Bureau of the Government-General of Korea, with the Railway Bureau taking over administration of the Korea Railway and renaming it the Chosen Government Railway (Sentetsu).

Japanese rule, 1910–1945
On 1 November 1911, Korea's first railway connection to another country was made, when the Yalu River Railway Bridge was completed across the Yalu River between Sinuiju and Andong, connecting the Gyeongui Line to the Anfeng Line of the South Manchuria Railway (Mantetsu). Work to convert the Anfeng Line from  narrow gauge to standard gauge was completed at the same time, thus connecting the capitals of Korea and China via Manchuria with a continuous railway line. Passenger service on the Gangan Line was discontinued on 31 March 1943, with general (public) freight traffic being relocated from Sinuiju Gangan to Sinuiju Station on 20 December of that year.

Over the following decades, numerous branch lines and privately owned railways were built connecting to the Gyeongui Line mainline. On 13 May 1916, the Mitsui Mining Railway (called Gaecheon Light Railway after 1927) opened the narrow gauge Gaecheon Line from Sinanju to Gaecheon, Sentetsu opened the Bakcheon Line from Maengjungni to Bakcheon on 10 December 1926, on 27 September 1939 the Pyeongbuk Railway opened its line from Jeongju to Cheongsu and Supung, where the Supung Dam was built; the Emperor of Manchukuo, Puyi, visited the Supung Dam, travelling by rail via the Gyeongui Line and the Pyeongbuk Railway. On 31 October 1939 the Dasado Railway opened its Sinuiju–South Sinuiju Interlocking–Yangsi–Dasado Port line, and on 29 October 1940, extended it from Yangsi south to Namsi, connecting it to the Gyeongui Line there, too. This resulted in a shorter route than the original mainline between South Sinuiju and Namsi, leading Sentetsu to nationalise the Sinuiju—Namsi line on 1 April 1943, naming it the Yangsi Line. South Sinuiju Interlocking was elevated to station status on 16 October 1943.

Between 1917 and 1925, the management of Sentetsu was transferred to the South Manchuria Railway, during this time, Sentetsu was referred to as "Mantetsu Gyeongseong Bureau"; however, on 1 April 1925 management of railways in Korea was returned to the Railway Bureau, and Sentetsu became independent once again. Passenger service was expanded in the 1930s, seeing the introduction of the "Hikari" limited express running from Busan to Xinjing, Manchukuo, in November 1934; then, in November 1939, the North China Transportation Company, in conjunction with Sentetsu and Mantetsu, introduced the "Koa" and "Tairiku" limited express trains, running between Pusan and Beijing. The "Koa" made the trip in 39 hours 30 minutes in 1940, but as the situation deteriorated due to the Pacific War, travel times increased, taking 49 hours by January 1945. The train remained in operation until Japan's defeat. By 1943 traffic levels were sufficiently high to justify double tracking of the entire line between P'yŏngyang and Sinŭiju, with the work being completed on 15 May 1943.

Following Japan's defeat in the Pacific War and the subsequent partition of Korea, the Gyeongui Line was divided at the 38th parallel between North and South Korea. On 25 August 1945, the Soviet Army began operating trains on the line north of Sariwon, whilst trains in the south terminated at Gaeseong. In 1946, the railways in both North and South were nationalised, creating the Korean National Railroad in the South and the Korean State Railway in the North. After the Korean War, the Gyeongui Line was split into three sections. In the South, the Seoul–Jangdan section became the KNR's Gyeongui Line, retaining the same name; in the North, the Bongdong–Pyeongyang section became the P'yŏngbu Line, whilst the Pyeongyang–Sinuiju section became the P'yŏngŭi Line.

For the post-war history of the various sections of Sentetsu's Gyeongui Line, see Gyeongui Line for the Southern section, and P'yŏngbu Line, P'yŏngŭi Line, Yangsi Line, and Paengma Line for the sections in the North.

Route

References

Sentetsu railway lines
Railway lines in Korea
1905 establishments in Korea